Fumaric acid is an organic compound with the formula HO2CCH=CHCO2H. A white solid, fumaric acid occurs widely in nature.  It has a fruit-like taste and has been used as a food additive. Its E number is E297. The salts and esters are known as fumarates.  Fumarate can also refer to the  ion (in solution). Fumaric acid is the trans isomer of butenedioic acid, while maleic acid is the cis isomer.

Biosynthesis and occurrence
It is produced in eukaryotic organisms from succinate in complex 2 of the electron transport chain via the enzyme succinate dehydrogenase.  It is one of two isomeric unsaturated dicarboxylic acids, the other being maleic acid.  In fumaric acid the carboxylic acid groups are trans (E) and in maleic acid they are cis (Z).

Fumaric acid is found in fumitory (Fumaria officinalis), bolete mushrooms (specifically Boletus fomentarius var. pseudo-igniarius), lichen, and Iceland moss.

Fumarate is an intermediate in the citric acid cycle used by cells to produce energy in the form of adenosine triphosphate (ATP) from food.  It is formed by the oxidation of succinate by the enzyme succinate dehydrogenase.  Fumarate is then converted by the enzyme fumarase to malate.

Human skin naturally produces fumaric acid when exposed to sunlight.

Fumarate is also a product of the urea cycle.

Uses

Food
Fumaric acid has been used as a food acidulant since 1946. It is approved for use as a food additive in the EU, USA and Australia and New Zealand. As a food additive, it is used as an acidity regulator and can be denoted by the E number E297. It is generally used in beverages and baking powders for which requirements are placed on purity. Fumaric acid is used in the making of wheat tortillas as a food preservative and as the acid in leavening. It is generally used as a substitute for tartaric acid and occasionally in place of citric acid, at a rate of 1 g of fumaric acid to every ~1.5 g of citric acid, in order to add sourness, similarly to the way malic acid is used. As well as being a component of some artificial vinegar flavors, such as "Salt and Vinegar" flavored potato chips, it is also used as a coagulant in stove-top pudding mixes.

The European Commission Scientific Committee on Animal Nutrition, part of DG Health, found in 2014 that fumaric acid is "practically non-toxic" but high doses are probably nephrotoxic after long-term use.

Medicine
Fumaric acid was developed as a medicine to treat the autoimmune condition psoriasis in the 1950s in Germany as a tablet containing 3 esters, primarily dimethyl fumarate, and marketed as Fumaderm by Biogen Idec in Europe. Biogen would later go on to develop the main ester, dimethyl fumarate, as a treatment for multiple sclerosis. 

In patients with relapsing-remitting multiple sclerosis, the ester dimethyl fumarate (BG-12, Biogen) significantly reduced relapse and disability progression in a phase 3 trial. It activates the Nrf2 antioxidant response pathway, the primary cellular defense against the cytotoxic effects of oxidative stress.

Other uses
Fumaric acid is used in the manufacture of polyester resins and polyhydric alcohols and as a mordant for dyes.

When fumaric acid is added to their feed, lambs produce up to 70% less methane during digestion.

Safety
It is "practically non-toxic" but high doses are probably nephrotoxic after long-term use.

Synthesis and reactions
Fumaric acid was first prepared from succinic acid.  A traditional synthesis involves oxidation of furfural (from the processing of maize) using chlorate in the presence of a vanadium-based catalyst.
Currently, industrial synthesis of fumaric acid is mostly based on catalytic isomerisation of maleic acid  in aqueous solutions at low pH.  Maleic acid is accessible in large volumes as a hydrolysis product of maleic anhydride, produced by catalytic oxidation of benzene or butane.

The chemical properties of fumaric acid can be anticipated from its component functional groups.  This weak acid forms a diester, it undergoes additions across the double bond, and it is an excellent dienophile.

Fumaric acid does not combust in a bomb calorimeter under conditions where maleic acid deflagrates smoothly.  For teaching experiments designed to measure the difference in energy between the cis- and trans- isomers, a measured quantity of carbon can be ground with the subject compound and the enthalpy of combustion computed by difference.

See also
Citric acid cycle (TCA cycle)
Photosynthesis
Maleic acid, the cis isomer of fumaric acid

References

External links
International Chemical Safety Card 1173

Dicarboxylic acids
Food additives
Food acidity regulators
 
Urea cycle
Citric acid cycle compounds
Nephrotoxins
E-number additives
Alkene derivatives